Patriarch Cosmas II may refer to:

 Cosmas II of Constantinople, Ecumenical  Patriarch in 1146–1147
 Cosmas II of Alexandria, Greek Patriarch of Alexandria in 1723–1736